The hexapentakis truncated icosahedron is a convex polyhedron constructed as an augmented truncated icosahedron. It is geodesic polyhedron {3,5+}3,0, with pentavalent vertices separated by an edge-direct distance of 3 steps.

Construction
Geodesic polyhedra are constructed by subdividing faces of simpler polyhedra, and then projecting the new vertices onto the surface of a sphere. A geodesic polyhedron has straight edges and flat faces that approximate a sphere, but it can also be made as a spherical polyhedron (A tessellation on a sphere) with true geodesic curved edges on the surface of a sphere. and spherical triangle faces.

Related polyhedra

Pentakis truncated icosahedron

The pentakis truncated icosahedron is a convex polyhedron constructed as an augmented truncated icosahedron, adding pyramids to the 12 pentagonal faces, creating 60 new triangular faces.

It is geometrically similar to the icosahedron where the 20 triangular faces are subdivided with a central hexagon, and 3 corner triangles.

Dual
Its dual polyhedron can be called a pentatruncated pentakis dodecahedron, a dodecahedron, with its vertices augmented by pentagonal pyramids, and then truncated the apex of those pyramids, or adding a pentagonal prism to each face of the dodecahedron. It is the net of a dodecahedral prism.

Hexakis truncated icosahedron

The hexakis truncated icosahedron is a convex polyhedron constructed as an augmented truncated icosahedron, adding pyramids to the 20 hexagonal faces, creating 120 new triangular faces.

It is visually similar to the chiral snub dodecahedron which has 80 triangles and 12 pentagons.

Dual 
The dual polyhedron can be seen as a hexatruncated pentakis dodecahedron, a dodecahedron with its faces augmented by pentagonal pyramids (a pentakis dodecahedron), and then its 6-valance vertices truncated.

It has similar groups of irregular pentagons as the pentagonal hexecontahedron.

See also
 Hexatetrakis truncated octahedron

References

 Antony Pugh, Polyhedra: a visual approach, 1976, Chapter 6. The Geodesic Polyhedra of R. Buckminster Fuller and Related Polyhedra''
  Reprinted by Dover 1999

External links 
 VTML polyhedral generator Try "ktI" (Conway polyhedron notation)

Geodesic polyhedra